Lilieth Belén Rivera Garcia (born 11 August 1998) is a Nicaraguan footballer who plays as a forward for UNAN Managua and the Nicaragua national team.

References

2001 births
Living people
Women's association football midfielders
Nicaragua women's international footballers
Nicaraguan women's footballers